Borejci is a small village in the Municipality of Tišina in the Prekmurje region of northeastern Slovenia.

References

External links 
Borejci on Geopedia

Populated places in the Municipality of Tišina